Raillietia is a genus of mites placed in its own family, Railletiidae, in the order Mesostigmata. Its name honours French parasitologist Louis-Joseph Alcide Railliet. It contains seven recognized species:

 Raillietia acevedoi Quintero-Martinez, Bassols-Batalla & DaMassa, 1992
 Raillietia auris (Leidy, 1872)
 Raillietia australis Domrow, 1961
 Raillietia caprae Quintero, Bassols & Acevedo, 1980
 Raillietia flechtmanni Faccini, Leite & da-Costa, 1992
 Raillietia manfredi Domrow, 1980
 Raillietia whartoni Potter & Johnston, 1978

References

Mesostigmata